The David Butt Memorial Trophy is an annual rugby union knock-out club competition organized by the Devon Rugby Football Union. It was introduced at the start of the 2016-17 season in honour of David Butt, who had been chair of the Devon RFU, and had died back in April 2016. The first ever winners of the competition were New Cross who won the final held at Pottingham Road in Barnstaple.

The David Butt Memorial Trophy is open to club sides in Devon that play at tier 9 (Devon League 1) and tier 10 (Devon League 2) of the English rugby union league system and is held during the autumn months as a prelude to league action.  The current format involves a first round group stage, organized by geography to minimize travel, followed by a knock-out stage featuring semi-finals and a final to be held at a neutral venue.

David Butt Memorial Trophy winners

Number of wins
New Cross (1)
South Molton (1)

See also
 Devon RFU
 Devon Senior Cup
 Devon Intermediate Cup
 Devon Junior Cup
 Havill Plate
 English rugby union system
 Rugby union in England

References

External links
 Devon RFU

Recurring sporting events established in 2016
2016 establishments in England
Rugby union cup competitions in England
Rugby union in Devon